Oskar Buur Rasmussen (born 31 March 1998) is a Danish footballer who plays as a right-back for Dutch club FC Volendam.

Youth career
Buur started playing football at the age of 4, because his big brother also did. The first club he played for was FC Skanderborg, then he joined AGF as a U14 player.

Club career

AGF
At the age of 16 Buur was promoted to the U19 squad. Shortly after that he began training with the first team squad, due to many injuries in the squad. Buur won the 2014 Martin Jørgensens Talent Prize, given by former footballer Martin Jørgensen. Jørgensen said Buur was a player who didn't answer the older players back but instead just respected them.

On 25 February 2015, Buur signed a new contract with AGF, and was promoted to the first team squad after playing several friendly matches for them.

On 15 March 2015 at the age of only 16, Buur made his official debut for AGF in a Danish 1st Division game against AB and played the whole match. He became the 6th youngest player to debut in the Danish Superliga.

After only 10 league games for the club, he didn't get his contract extended and left in the summer of 2017.

Brabrand IF
After leaving AGF, Buur signed for Brabrand IF in the Danish 1st Division on 22 July 2017. Buur only played a few friendly games for the club, before leaving again.

Wolverhampton Wanderers
On 24 August 2017, Buur signed for then-English Championship club Wolverhampton Wanderers on a two-year deal after an extended trial at the club. He made his first team debut at home to Bristol Rovers on 19 September in the EFL Cup. Buur played the first 90 minutes, and was substituted in the break between normal time and extra time. The game was 0–0 after 90 minutes. Wolves went on to win 1–0 after extra-time. He made his league debut for Wolves, and scored his first professional goal, after coming on as a substitute in a 2–2 draw with Hull City on 3 April 2018, en route to the team winning promotion to the Premier League.

On 12 December 2019, Buur made his first appearance in a UEFA club competition, appearing in Wolves' final 2019-20 UEFA Europa League group stage game against Beşiktaş at Molineux. He provided the assist for Diogo Jota's hat-trick goal. He made his Premier League debut on 14 September 2020, appearing as a second-half substitute in a 2-0 away win against Sheffield United.

In February 2020, Buur signed a new deal with Wolves which lasts until the summer of 2023.

On 31 January 2022 it was confirmed that Buur's contract with Wolves had been terminated.

Loan to Grasshopper Club Zurich
On 11 January 2021, Buur joined Grasshopper Club Zürich in the Swiss Challenge League on an 18 month loan deal. He made 10 appearances for the club, on their way to winning the 2020-21 Swiss Challenge League title.

Volendam
On 8 February 2022, Buur joined Dutch Eerste Divisie club FC Volendam on a deal until June 2024.

Career statistics

Honours
Wolverhampton Wanderers
Football League/EFL Championship: 2017–18
Premier League Asia Trophy: 2019
Premier League 2 - Division 2: 2018-19

Grasshopper Club Zürich
Swiss Challenge League: 2020-21

References

External links

Oskar Buur on DBU 

1998 births
Living people
Danish men's footballers
Danish people of Dutch descent
Danish expatriate men's footballers
Denmark youth international footballers
Association football defenders
Brabrand IF players
Aarhus Gymnastikforening players
Wolverhampton Wanderers F.C. players
Grasshopper Club Zürich players
FC Volendam players
English Football League players
Danish Superliga players
Premier League players
Swiss Challenge League players
Expatriate footballers in England
Expatriate footballers in Switzerland
Expatriate footballers in the Netherlands
Danish expatriate sportspeople in England
Danish expatriate sportspeople in Switzerland
Danish expatriate sportspeople in the Netherlands